Mike Wheat (born 1947) was a justice of the Montana Supreme Court from 2010 to 2017. He was appointed to the court in 2010  by Governor Brian Schweitzer to fill the vacated seat of Justice John Warner.

Background
Wheat was born in Spokane, Washington, in 1947. He served with the United States Marine Corps and fought in the Vietnam War from 1968–69 and was awarded the Purple Heart. After the war Wheat attended the University of Montana and graduated with a BA in Political Science in 1975. He received his JD from the Alexander Blewett III School of Law at the University of Montana in 1978. After graduation  he worked as a deputy county attorney in Butte, Montana until 1981, when he moved to Bozeman, Montana to start his own private law firm, Cok, Wheat & Kinzler.

Wheat was elected to the Montana State Senate and served two Legislative sessions from 2002 to 2005. In 2008 Wheat ran an unsuccessful primary for Montana state attorney general. Wheat was re-elected to the Montana Supreme Court in 2010 and 2014. In 2017, Wheat announced that he would retire at the end of the year to spend more time with his family. His successor on the Montana Supreme Court will be Ingrid Gustafson.

See also
Dark Money (film)

References

1947 births
Living people
Justices of the Montana Supreme Court
Montana state senators
University of Montana alumni
United States Marine Corps personnel of the Vietnam War
United States Marines